Rua is a Portuguese parish, located in the municipality of Moimenta da Beira. The population in 2011 was 601, in an area of 9.67 km2. Until the late 19th century, the town was the most important in the municipality.

References

Freguesias of Moimenta da Beira